Alan George Cuckston (born 1940, Horsforth, Leeds, England) is an English harpsichordist, pianist, conductor, and lecturer.

Alan Cuckston was born near Leeds and studied music with Fanny Waterman and Lamar Crowson and at King's College, Cambridge, 1959–63. He successfully auditioned for the BBC, and has given frequent broadcasts as keyboard and harpsichord soloist. Cuckston also and joined the staff of the Music Department at the Barber Institute of Fine Arts at the University of Birmingham. In 1968 he played the Proms at the Royal Albert Hall, the repertoire of which included: the Monteverdi Choir, the Philip Jones Brass Ensemble, the English Chamber Orchestra, Vespro della Beata Vergine, and conductor John Eliot Gardiner.

As a freelance player "of international repute" and specialising in early keyboard instruments (harpsichord, organ and fortepiano), Cuckston has given concerts in many parts of Europe and North America and has toured as harpsichordist with the Academy of St Martin-in-the-Fields and as organist with Pro Cantione Antiqua. He also lectures in classical music

Cuckston has produced an extensive repertoire of recordings, ranging from the Middle Ages to the present day. He has released music by Handel, Rameau and Couperin (Naxos Records) and the complete piano music of Alan Rawsthorne (Swinsty Records). Cuckston is also featured in The Creel.

Additionally Cuckston has commissioned works for harpsichord by Elizabeth Maconchy, Ronald Stevenson, David Wooldridge, and Phillip Ramey. Cuckston's focus is very much on the Baroque period, and he had a harpsichord built by John Rooks of Ticknall, Derbyshire, based on a 1638 harpsichord made by Andreas Ruckers. His organ recitals are likewise recognised as "fine pieces enhanced by the bright tone and impeccable, unobtrusive and exemplary playing".

References

Further reading 
Cuckston, Alan (George). The Concise Oxford Dictionary of Music (Fourth Edition), p. 174. Oxford University Press. 

1940 births
Living people
English harpsichordists
English classical pianists
English conductors (music)
Musicians from Leeds
21st-century classical pianists